The Hungarian Open is an annual table tennis tournament held in Hungary by the International Table Tennis Federation (ITTF). It is currently part of the ITTF World Tour.

History

The Hungarian Open was first included on the ITTF Pro Tour schedule in 2010. It returned to the schedule in 2012 as part of the rebranded ITTF World Tour, and after not appearing in 2013 the tournament made its second return in 2014 as part of the new third-tier Challenge Series. In 2016, the tournament was promoted to the second-tier Major Series, and in August 2016 it was confirmed that the event would keep its place on the schedule as part of the revamped ITTF World Tour in 2017.

Champions

2010–2018

2019–

See also
 European Table Tennis Union

References

External links
 International Table Tennis Federation

 
Table tennis competitions
ITTF World Tour
Table tennis competitions in Hungary
Recurring sporting events established in 2010
2010 establishments in Hungary